Carlos Alberto Portugal Correia de Lacerda (September 20, 1928 – August 27, 2007) was a Portuguese poet and BBC Radio Presenter.

Biography 
Alberto de Lacerda was born in Mozambique in 1928. In 1946, Lacerda moved to Lisbon. In 1951, he began work at the BBC as a radio presenter and settled in London. He travelled in Brazil between 1959 and 1960 at the invitation of the Brazilian Modernist Manuel Bandeira. He returned to London and worked as a freelance journalist and broadcaster. He taught European and Comparative literature at the Universities of Austin, Texas and Boston, Massachusetts from where he retired in 1996 as a Professor Emeritus of Poetics. He published in Portugal, Britain and the US and contributed to many literary publications in various countries.

Lacerda died on the 27th of August 2007 in London aged 78. His body was found by the English art critic John McEwen, with whom he had a lunch planned.

Published Poetry
1951 - Poemas
1955 - 77 Poems
1961 - Palácio
1963 - Exílio
1969 - Selected Poems
1981 - Tauromagia
1984 - Oferenda I
1987 - Elegias de Londres
1988 - Meio-Dia (Prémio Pen Club)
1991 - Sonetos
1994 - Oferenda II
1997 - Àtrio
2001 - Horizonte

References 

http://www.fmsoares.pt/aeb/dossiers/n_dossier14/fotos.php

http://www.albertodelacerda.com

External links
Obituary in The Times, 27 September 2007

1928 births
2007 deaths
21st-century Portuguese poets
Portuguese male poets
20th-century Portuguese poets
20th-century male writers
21st-century male writers

Portuguese people of Mozambican descent